Sharon Richardson (born May 26, 1943) is an American gymnast. She competed in six events at the 1960 Summer Olympics.

References

External links
 

1943 births
Living people
American female artistic gymnasts
Olympic gymnasts of the United States
Gymnasts at the 1960 Summer Olympics
People from Albion, Dane County, Wisconsin
Sportspeople from Wisconsin
Pan American Games medalists in gymnastics
Pan American Games gold medalists for the United States
Gymnasts at the 1959 Pan American Games
Medalists at the 1959 Pan American Games
21st-century American women